The Very Best of Cilla Black was a TV advertised compilation album by English singer Cilla Black, originally released in 1983 by EMI Records UK on vinyl LP and Cassette to mark her 20th anniversary in show business. The album reached No. 20 on the UK Albums Chart in 1983. The album was certified Silver by the BPI on 28 January 1983. The album was later re-issued on EMI's budget label Music for Pleasure.

Track listing

Side 1
"Love of the Loved"
"Anyone Who Had a Heart"
"You're My World"
"It's for You"
"You've Lost That Lovin' Feelin'"
"I've Been Wrong Before"
"Love's Just a Broken Heart"
"Alfie"
"Don't Answer Me"
"A Fool Am I"

Side 2
"What Good Am I?"
"I Only Live to Love You"
"Step Inside Love"
"Where Is Tomorrow?"
"Surround Yourself with Sorrow"
"Conversations"
"If I Thought You'd Ever Change Your Mind"
"Something Tells Me (Something's Gonna Happen Tonight)"
"Baby We Can't Go Wrong"
"Liverpool Lullaby"

Credits
Personnel
 Lead vocals by Cilla Black

Charts

Certifications

|-

References

External links

Further reading
 

1983 compilation albums
Parlophone compilation albums
Cilla Black albums